Vern Thomsen is a former American  football coach.  He was the 15th head football coach at Northwest Missouri State University in Maryville, Missouri, serving for five seasons, from 1983 to 1987, and compiling a record of 24–31–1.

Head coaching record

College

References

Year of birth missing (living people)
Living people
Northwest Missouri State Bearcats football coaches
Junior college football coaches in the United States